Virginia Bardach Martín (born 3 April 1992) is an Argentine swimmer. She competed in the women's 400 metre individual medley event at the 2016 Summer Olympics. She also competed in the women's 400 metre individual medley event at the 2020 Summer Olympics.

Career 
She competed at the 2019 Pan American Games, winning a silver medal in the Women’s 400m Individual Medley. and gold medal in Women's 200 m butterfly.

References

External links
 
 Argentina's Virginia Bardach Martin smiles after winning the silver medal 

1992 births
Living people
Argentine female swimmers
Olympic swimmers of Argentina
Sportspeople from Córdoba, Argentina
Swimmers at the 2016 Summer Olympics
Swimmers at the 2019 Pan American Games
South American Games gold medalists for Argentina
South American Games silver medalists for Argentina
South American Games bronze medalists for Argentina
South American Games medalists in swimming
Competitors at the 2010 South American Games
Pan American Games medalists in swimming
Pan American Games gold medalists for Argentina
Pan American Games silver medalists for Argentina
Pan American Games bronze medalists for Argentina
Swimmers at the 2011 Pan American Games
Swimmers at the 2015 Pan American Games
Female medley swimmers
Medalists at the 2019 Pan American Games
Swimmers at the 2020 Summer Olympics
21st-century Argentine women
20th-century Argentine women